The commune of Bugabira is a commune of Kirundo Province in northern Burundi. The capital lies at Bugabira.

References

Communes of Burundi
Kirundo Province